Anne Lise Broadbent is a mathematician at the University of Ottawa who won the 2016 Aisenstadt Prize for her research in quantum computing, quantum cryptography, and quantum information.

Early life and education
Broadbent specialised in music at De La Salle High School in Ottawa, graduating in 1997. Her interest in science led her to major in mathematics for her undergraduate degree.

Broadbent was a student of Alain Tapp and Gilles Brassard at the Université de Montréal, where she completed her master's in 2004 in the topic of Quantum pseudo-telepathy games, and her Ph.D. in 2008 with a dissertation on Quantum nonlocality, cryptography and complexity.

Career 
After postdoctoral studies at the Institute for Quantum Computing at the University of Waterloo, she moved to Ottawa in 2014. She is an associate professor at the University of Ottawa and holds a University Research Chair there.

Awards
Broadbent is the winner of the 2010 John Charles Polanyi Prize in Physics of the Council of Ontario Universities. She was awarded the Aisenstadt Prize by International Scientific Advisory Committee of the Centre de Recherches Mathématiques in 2016 for her leadership and work in quantum information and cryptography.

References

External links

Year of birth missing (living people)
Living people
Canadian mathematicians
Women mathematicians
Quantum physicists
Université de Montréal alumni
Academic staff of the University of Ottawa